The Geospatial Research Centre (NZ) Ltd. is a consultancy company based in Christchurch, New Zealand in the University of Canterbury's Engineering department. It was set up in 2006 by the University of Canterbury, the University of Nottingham, and the Canterbury Development Corporation. The director is Dr David Park. Their research focuses on civilian uses of Unmanned Aerial Vehicles, and on remote sensing and sensor integration.

See also
UCi3

External links
Geospatial Research Centre (company website)

Information technology companies of New Zealand
University of Canterbury
Geographic data and information companies